C command may refer to:
C syntax, keywords in the C programming language
C standard library, a set of subroutines available to programs in the C programming language
c-command, the "uncle" relationship in a parse tree